Dara Birnbaum (born 1946) is an American video and installation artist. Birnbaum entered the nascent field of video art in the mid-to-late 1970s challenging the gendered biases of the period and television’s ever-growing presence within the American household. Her oeuvre primarily addresses ideological and aesthetic features of mass media through the intersection of video art and television. She uses video to reconstruct television imagery using materials such as archetypal formats as quizzes, soap operas, and sports programmes. Her techniques involve the repetition of images and interruption of flow with text and music. She is also well known for forming part of the feminist art movement that emerged within video art in the mid-1970s. Birnbaum lives and works in New York.

Early life and education
Dara Birnbaum was born in 1946 in New York. In 1969 she received her BA in architecture at Carnegie Mellon University in Pittsburgh. She subsequently worked in the Lawrence Halprin & Associates architectural firm in New York City. Her work with the firm instilled a lifelong consideration of civic space and exploration of the relationship between private and public spheres in mass culture. In 1973 Birnbaum attained a BFA in painting from the San Francisco Art Institute.

Career and artistic practice
In 1975 Birnbaum moved to Florence for a year and was introduced to video art by the Centro Diffusione Grafica, a gallery that pioneered video art exhibitions. Shortly after her return to New York City in 1976, Birnbaum met Dan Graham, an artist/critic who greatly impacted her artistic development. He introduced her to Screen (journal), a British film-theory journal, which provided a critical analysis of mainstream cinema during the 1970s.  Birnbaum was very interested in the journal’s discussion of an emerging feminist context in the critique of cinema but found Screen (journal) to be flawed in its failure to consider television—a medium she believed to have replaced film as the dominant force of American mass culture.

During the mid-1970s, the poet Alan Sondheim lent Birnbaum his Sony Portapak, which enabled her to create her first experimental video works, such as Control Piece and Mirroring. These works explored the separation between the body and its representation through the use of mirrors and projected images. The presence of mirrors continued into her late-1970s video works which focused primarily on the appropriation and of television's conventions. Through the fragmentation and repetition of TV conventions, she used borrowed images to examine the medium's technical structures and bodily gestures.

These explorations laid a foundation for her most prominent work,  the 1978 - 1979 video art piece Technology/Transformation: Wonder Woman. In this work she used appropriated images of Wonder Woman to subvert ideological subtexts and meanings embedded in the television series. "Opening with a prolonged salvo of fiery explosions accompanied by the warning cry of a siren, Technology/Transformation: Wonder Woman is supercharged, action-packed, and visually riveting... throughout its nearly six minutes we see several scenes featuring the main character Diana Prince... in which she transforms into the famed superhero." Her citational use of Wonder Woman illustrates the efforts she made into exploring "television on television," which indicates a consciousness of analyzing the television/video medium within its own terms, an exploration of the structural elements of television content, and an attempt to talk back to television.

In 1979 she started to make fast-edited video collages from footage appropriated while working for a TV post-production unit. In 1982 Birnbaum created the piece titled PM Magazine/Acid Rock with appropriated video from the nightly T.V. Show, PM Magazine, and a segment of a Wang Computers commercial. Created for Documenta 7 as part of a four channel video installation, PM Magazine/Acid Rock underscores the themes of consumerism, T.V., and feminism in Birnbaum's work through the use of pop images and a recomposed version of "L.A. Woman" by the Doors.  She participated in the 1985 Whitney Biennial.

In her 1990 single channel video work Cannon: Taking to the Street the political act of taking to the street is framed through an iconic evocation of the Paris uprising of May 1968, interspersed with amateur footage from a Take Back the Night march held at Princeton University in April, 1987.

Her 1994 six channel video installation Hostage has as its subject the kidnapping of Hanns-Martin Schleyer in 1977.

Technology/Transformation: Wonder Woman is held in the collection of the Museum of Modern Art. She also has works in the collection of the National Gallery of Canada.

Selected works
Dara Birnbaum works distributed by the Electronic Arts Intermix include:
Technology/Transformation: Wonder Woman 1978-79, 5:50 min, color, sound
Kiss The Girls: Make Them Cry (1979), 6:50 min, color, sound
Local TV News Analysis (1980), 61:08 min, color, sound
Pop-Pop Video (1980), 9 min, color, sound
General Hospital/Olympic Women Speed Skating (1980), 6 min, color, sound
Kojak/Wang (1980), 3 min, color, sound
Remy/Grand Central: Trains and Boats and Planes (1980), 4:18 min, color, sound
Fire! Hendrix (1982), 3:13 min, color, sound
PM Magazine/Acid Rock (1982), 4:09 min, color, sound
Damnation of Faust: Evocation (1983), 10:02 min, color, sound
Damnation of Faust: Will-o'-the-Wisp (A Deceitful Goal) (1985), 5:46 min, color, sound
Artbreak, MTV Networks, Inc. (1987), 30 sec, color, sound
Damnation of Faust: Charming Landscape (1987), 6:30 min, color, sound
Canon: Taking to the Streets, Part One: Princeton University - Take Back the Night (1990), 10 min, color, sound
Transgressions (1992), 60 sec, color, sound

Arabesque, Special Limited Edition 2021

Dara Birnbaum is the first artist who participated in the D’ORO D’ART Project, for the creation of books that contain digital art. Birnbaum took on the challenge of specially transforming her four-channel video, Arabesque from 2011, to a single-channel video for the book. In the video, sound and image are integrated, and together retrace the love and artistic relationship of Robert and Clara Schumann. Birnbaum brought together selections from films of performances of Robert Schumann’s Arabesque Opus 18 and from films of Clara Schumann’s Romanze 1, Opus 11. Birnbaum juxtaposed these clips with still images made from footage of the 1947 film about the Schumanns, Song of Love, which tellingly features only Robert Schumann's Arabesque Opus 18. Birnbaum’s Arabesque delicately reflects on the troubled love relationship of Robert and Clara Schumann, a love relationship closely linked to music, as they are both pianists. The video Arabesque, Special Limited Edition 2021 is activated by opening the book in which it is contained. The curators of the project are Barbara London and Valentino Catricalà. The book is produced by the publishing house D'ORO Collection, based in Rome. Arabesque, Special Limited Edition 2021 was post-produced by Michael Saia. The video lasts 6 min. and 29 seconds.

Awards
In 2010 she won a United States Artists Fellow award.

Notes

References

External links
 Dara Birnbaum at the MNCARS

1946 births
Living people
Feminist artists
Jewish American artists
American installation artists
American video artists
Postmodern artists
Women video artists
American women installation artists
20th-century American women artists
21st-century American women artists
21st-century American Jews